Tobi Adeyemo (born 14 March 2005) is an English professional footballer who plays as a forward for EFL Championship club Watford.

Career
Born in the London district of Hackney, Adeyemo grew up near Tottenham. He was educated at St Ignatius Primary, where he played above his age group on the school's football team, and St Thomas More Catholic School in Wood Green.

Having played football for the Haringey representative side, he trialled with Arsenal through the Rap Aid Academy. An e-mail invitation to trial with Chelsea, whom he had scored against for Arsenal, was missed by his father, and by the time it was found Adeyemo was on trial with Watford, whose youth system he joined formally in October 2018. He started a two-year scholarship with the club's academy in July 2021. 

Adeyemo joined Southern League Premier Division Central side Hitchin Town for one month in November 2022 on a work experience loan, with the deal later extended to 18 January 2023.

Adeyemo made his professional debut for Watford on 7 January 2023, coming on as a 75th minute substitute for Joseph Hungbo in a 2–0 away defeat to Reading in the third round of the FA Cup. On 14 January, he made his league debut, coming on as a substitute for Vakoun Issouf Bayo in the 68th minute of an EFL Championship home game against Blackpool. Just four minutes later, he scored his first professional goal, opening the score for his side, who would go on to win 2–0.

Personal life
Adeyemo is of Nigerian descent.

Career statistics

Club
.

References

2005 births
Living people
English people of Nigerian descent
Footballers from Hackney, London
Footballers from Greater London
English footballers
Association football forwards
Southern Football League players
English Football League players
Watford F.C. players
Hitchin Town F.C. players
Black British sportspeople